Quicknet is an Ajax framework (using XMLHttpRequest in JavaScript) designed to develop web applications or websites that use passwords to identify correct users. Using this framework, no cleartext password would be sent over the network or stored in the server. Quicknet supports multi-language, JavaScript cooperative multitasking, AJAX call, session and password management, modular structure, XML content, and JavaScript animation. It uses PHP on the server side, and JavaScript on the client side.

System requirements
Server-side
Quicknet should run on any server with Apache 2.2+, MySQL 5.1+ and PHP 5+ .

Client-side
Quicknet should be compatible with Internet Explorer 7+, Firefox 3+, Opera 9+, Safari 3+ and Google Chrome 1+ .

Session and Password Management
Quicknet is an AJAX framework that aims to protect users’ passwords with specially designed algorithm. This is achieved by using the same Cryptographic hash function in JavaScript code on the client-side, as well as PHP code on the server-side, to generate and compare hash results based on users’ passwords and some random data. However, no cleartext password would be sent over the network or stored in the server. It is believed that it is impossible to steal a session or discover the user's original password, even if the data sent over the network and/or stored on the server is known.

Secure Data Transmission
Currently, Quicknet is possibly the only PHP AJAX framework that provides secure data transmission without SSL.

Multi-language
Currently, Quicknet is possibly the only PHP AJAX framework with built-in support for multi-language. Developers could easily add new language to build their own systems.

See also
Ajax framework

External links 
 

Ajax (programming)
Secure communication